Total War: Warhammer III is a turn-based strategy and real-time tactics video game developed by Creative Assembly and published by Sega. It is part of the Total War series, and the third to be set in Games Workshop's Warhammer Fantasy fictional universe (following 2016's Total War: Warhammer and 2017's Total War: Warhammer II). The game was announced on February 3, 2021 and was released on February 17, 2022. It received positive reviews from critics and was nominated for the British Academy Games Award for British Game at the 19th British Academy Games Awards.

Gameplay
Like its predecessors, Total War: Warhammer III features turn-based strategy and real-time tactics gameplay similar to other games in the Total War series.

In the campaign, players move armies around the map and manage settlements in a turn-based manner. Players engage in diplomacy with, and fight against, AI-controlled factions. When armies meet, they battle in real-time. The game will also have a custom battles mode where players can create customised real-time battles, as well as online multiplayer battles. Those who own races from the first two games will have the same races unlocked for multiplayer in the third game; a combined world map, named "Immortal Empires", similar to the "Mortal Empires" campaign in Total War: Warhammer II for owners of the first two games. Immortal Empires released as a Beta on August 23, 2022 with patch 2.0.

The races announced with the game are the human civilizations of Grand Cathay (based on Imperial China) and Kislev (based on Medieval Russia), and five Chaos factions - four devoted to each of the Chaos Gods (Khorne, Tzeentch, Nurgle, and Slaanesh), and the Daemons of Chaos, led by a Daemon Prince that can be customized by earning "Daemonic Glory" through the course of the campaign. Another race, the Ogre Kingdoms, was made available to "early adopters" (those who pre-purchased the game before release, or purchased within the first week after release).

The main campaign takes place within the Realm of Chaos, said to be the source of all magic in the Warhammer Fantasy setting. Game director Ian Roxburgh has said the campaign map will be "twice the size" of the Eye of the Vortex campaign map that appeared in Total War: Warhammer II.

Plot

Prologue
During the end of winter in the lands of Kislev, Ursun, the Bear-God, would break winter with his roar and bring forth summer. One day, however, Ursun vanished, and for seven years Kislev has suffered an unending winter. The Barkov brothers, Yuri and Gerik, are sent by Tzarina Katarin on an expedition north to search for the missing god. During his prayer, Yuri hears Ursun's voice. Ursun claims that he has been imprisoned in the Howling Citadel, located in the Chaos Wastes.

Yuri travels with his brother and his army to the Chaos Wastes to free his god, but is slowly corrupted by Chaos in his methods to reach Ursun's prison. Eventually, Yuri murders his brother, Gerik, and offers his skull to a Greater Daemon of Khorne to build a bridge of skulls to cross the Howling Citadel. Yuri and his army reach the Howling Citadel, and after defeating a chaos-corrupted Boyar and his forces guarding the citadel's entrance, Yuri enters a portal to the Realm of Chaos.

After emerging from the portal, Yuri finds the imprisoned Ursun, and is greeted by Be'lakor (voiced by Richard Armitage), the first of the Daemon Princes. Be'lakor reveals that it was he who guided Yuri by mimicking Ursun's voice. Ursun begs Yuri to free him, but Be'lakor manipulates Yuri into thinking that Ursun is weak and unworthy of his worship, tempting him to kill the god and take his power for himself. Yuri renounces Ursun and shoots a Chaos-imbued bullet into the Bear-God's heart, and Ursun roars in pain. The resulting backlash hurls Yuri back to the material plane, with Yuri crashing into the ground severely wounded. Dying, Yuri offers his soul to the Chaos Gods and begs them to save him. The Chaos Gods answer his plea and ascend him into a Daemon Prince.

The Realm of Chaos
After the events of the prologue, Be'lakor has imprisoned the wounded Ursun in the Forge of Souls, located within the Realm of Chaos. Despising the Chaos Gods for taking away his power and physical form, Be'lakor plans to use Ursun's power to take his revenge. Ursun's pained roars have torn the fabric of reality, opening rifts between the material world and the Realm of Chaos and creating a maelstrom that has stranded Daemons in the mortal plane.

A character known as the Advisor (who provided the tutorials in the previous two games) has been enslaved by a corrupted book known as the Tome of Fates, bearing a curse of the Chaos God Tzeentch. He is able to use the book to offer counsel to others, but never for his own gain; however, he has learned that he can free himself from the book with a single drop of Ursun's blood. He goes to several factions seeking allies to achieve his goals, offering to guide them into the Realm of Chaos to find Ursun:

The rulers of the Tzardom of Kislev wish to free their god and put an end to the eternal winter that scours their land, though tensions are fraught between the Ice Court, led by Tzarina Katarin Bokha, aided by her secret society of Ice Witches, and the Great Orthodoxy, led by Supreme Patriarch Kostaltyn, who believes Katarin to be an unworthy ruler, too focused on magic and politics instead of devotion. During the campaign, a side quest unlocked by controlling the three main Kislevite cities (Kislev, Praag and Erengrad) allows either faction to rescue and awaken Katarin's father Boris Ursus, the Red Tzar and High Priest of Ursun, from his icy slumber in the Frozen Falls, unlocking Boris and his faction, the Ursun Revivalists, as a playable faction for future campaigns.

The dragon siblings of the Empire of Grand Cathay, Miao Ying the Storm Dragon (who controls the Northern Provinces) and Zhao Ming the Iron Dragon (who controls the Western Provinces), are unconcerned about Ursun's fate, believing themselves to be older and wiser than any god. However, they are still convinced to free Ursun, as the Bear-God is the only one who can inform them of the whereabouts of their missing sister Shen-Zoo, bringer of light and hope, who disappeared in Norsca long before.

The greedy, gluttonous Ogres of the Ogre Kingdoms in the Mountains of Mourn, led by the Overtyrant Greasus Goldtooth and the Prophet of the Great Maw, Skrag the Slaughterer, care little for the politics and conflict between Order and Chaos, but still desire to reach Ursun to feast on his divine flesh, and feed the remainders to their own god, the ravenous, eldritch entity known as the Great Maw.

The Daemons of Chaos each have their desires for Ursun. Skarbrand the Exiled One, greatest of all Bloodthirsters, wants Ursun's skull so he can gift it to Khorne, the Chaos God of Blood and War, in order to earn forgiveness for his betrayal in the past. Kairos Fateweaver, the two-headed Lord of Change and Oracle of Tzeentch, the Chaos God of Sorcery and Deception, plans to take Ursun's eyes to be able to see the present, as he can only perceive the past and future. Ku'Gath Plaguefather, greatest of the Great Unclean Ones of Nurgle, the Chaos God of Disease and Decay, wants to use Ursun's corpse to brew a great plague known as a God-Pox. N'kari the Arch-Tempter, most favoured of the Keepers of Secrets of Slaanesh, the Chaos God of Excess and Desire, wishes to delight in Ursun's eternal sorrow. Yuri Barkov, now a Daemon Prince known as the God-Slayer and leading the Daemons of Chaos Undivided, seeks to finish what he started by truly slaying Ursun and taking revenge on Be'lakor for his manipulations.

In order to reach the Forge of Souls where Ursun is imprisoned, each faction must travel to the Realm of Chaos, invade each of the four Chaos Gods' domains and capture the soul of a Daemon Prince bound to them. As the factions battle for the Daemon Princes' souls, it is revealed that Be'lakor intends to absorb Ursun's divine power once he dies to transform himself into the Chaos God of Shadows. With an army of Soul Grinders created in the Forge of Souls, he will destroy the four Chaos Gods and rule unchallenged.

Once all four souls of the Daemon Princes have been captured, Ursun finally dies. As Be'lakor undergoes his ascension to godhood, the Advisor uses the souls of the Daemon Princes to create a bridge leading to the Forge of Souls. The player's faction battles Be'lakor's army before finally slaying the Dark Master and preventing his ascension. After the final battle, the fate of Ursun and the player's faction is revealed:

 The leaders of Kislev mourn the loss of Ursun, believing that with their God dead, Kislev will fall. However, Ursun is revived by their devotion, and with his roar, he puts an end to Kislev's endless winter. This is considered the canonical ending.
 The dragon siblings of Cathay use spirit magic to speak to Ursun, and before fading from existence, he clues them to the location of their missing sister.
 The Ogres butcher and feast on Ursun's carcass, and feed its remains to their deity, the Great Maw, briefly quelling its eternal, gnawing hunger.
 Skarbrand delivers the bear-god's skull to Khorne. Whilst the Blood God revels in such a worthy offering, he does not forgive Skarbrand for his betrayal, rendering Skarbrand's efforts in vain.
 Kairos takes Ursun's eyes, and with the sight of a god he is finally capable of viewing the past, present and future.
 Ku'Gath uses Ursun's corpse as the final ingredient to brew the ultimate plague, a God-Pox capable of infecting the gods themselves.
 N'kari captures the last remains of Ursun's spirit, basking in the god's anguish at Kislev's demise.
 The God-Slayer takes what power remains from Ursun's corpse, allowing him to ascend to godhood and becoming Kislev's new tyrannical ruler.

The epilogue has the Advisor freed of his slavery from the Tome of Fates, and he is joined by a white crow. However, when he attempts to read the book, his sight is stolen, and the white crow is revealed to be a Greater Daemon of Tzeentch, known as Sarthorael the Everwatcher, with the Daemon binding the Advisor to his service. The epilogue also reveals that the game takes place before the events of the first game. A postscript after the completion of the story, should the player elect to continue playing on the campaign map, reveals that Be'lakor was resurrected by Tzeentch and given physical form again, but placed into the service of those who killed him; the player is given the option to use Be'lakor in their own army.

Champions of Chaos
For millennia, the servants of the Chaos Gods have clashed in the ancient city of Zanbaijin, the souls of the fallen in these vicious conflicts sealed within the Altar of Battle at the city's heart. Now, Ursun's pained roars have weakened the seal of the Altar of Battle, and the myriad warrior-souls of bygone eras within it lay ripe for the taking; an amount that could forever change the balance of power between the four Chaos Gods. Thus, each of the gods commands one of their greatest champions to reach the city of Zanbaijin.

Azazel, the debauched Prince of Damnation, who was once a follower of Sigmar until he betrayed his lord and pledged loyalty to Slaanesh, leads the Ecstatic Legions. Festus the Leechlord, a demented Imperial physician cursed by Nurgle with knowledge of all diseases and their cures, leads the Fecundites. Vilitch the Curseling, a wretched sorcerer fused by Tzeentch to the hulking body of his warrior twin Thomin, leads the Puppets of Misrule. Valkia the Bloody, a warrior queen ascended by Khorne as his chosen consort, leads the Legion of the Gorequeen. These champions will force open the still-healing scars created by Ursun’s roar to forge a path towards the Fallen City, where they will shatter the seal on the Altar of Battles and claim the souls within for their patron god.

The final battle for the Altar pits the player's chosen champion against the armies of the other three, one at a time. However, when the last champion is defeated, the player is forced to confront Archaon the Everchosen, who seeks to prevent the player champion's god from gaining primacy over the others and disrupting his effort to bring about the End Times. If the player manages to defeat Archaon, the ritual is completed, and the souls are claimed, letting their patron deity become ascendant.

Downloadable content
Creative Assembly intends to release several paid and free DLC packs for the game, which expand its content. A free update for owners of Total War: Warhammer and Total War: Warhammer II named Immortal Empires was released in August 2022. It provides a massive campaign map that combines the maps and playable races of all three Total War: Warhammer games.

Certain legendary lords from the previous titles receive their own factions for the Immortal Empires campaign: Grombrindal the White Dwarf (The Ancestral Throng) for the Dwarfs, Helman Ghorst (Caravan of Blue Roses) for the Vampire Counts, Volkmar the Grim (Cult of Sigmar) for the Empire, and Archaon the Everchosen (Warhost of the Apocalypse), Sigvald the Magnificent (The Decadent Host) and Kholek Suneater (Heralds of the Tempest) for the Warriors of Chaos. Vlad and Isabella von Carstein, initially released separately in previous titles, are included together as part of the Sylvania (formerly Von Carstein) faction for the Vampire Counts; if the player chooses Vlad, Isabella is automatically unlocked as a hero (secondary leader), and vice versa. Be'lakor, the antagonist in the main story campaign, was also included as a playable legendary lord for the Warriors of Chaos with his own faction, the Shadow Legion.

Reception

Total War: Warhammer III received "generally favorable" reviews, according to review aggregator Metacritic.

Chris Tapsell of Eurogamer praised the game's tutorial and noted that the experience would be intimidating for new players because of the game's tendency to leave more intricate mechanics inadequately explained. He deemed the game to be a hectic and stressful yet fun and ultimately rewarding experience, and recommended it. Leana Hafer of IGN called the title a worthy capstone to the dark fantasy trilogy, praising its depth, quality of life improvements, alliances, and factions. Fraser Brown of PC Gamer praised the addition of new modes and features, namely the Daemons of Chaos, and noted that the tutorial in the game was "the best tutorial Creative Assembly has put together". Shacknews similarly praised the new campaigns, races, customization, art presentation, and setting, and cited the lack of DLSS and platter drive load times as minor issues.

PCGamesN liked the new campaign, saying it was an improvement over Warhammer II's because of a more interesting endgame, "It’s so much better than Warhammer II’s Vortex campaign... But because the winner in Warhammer II was whomever accrued the most ritual currency, their victory often felt just as inevitable as ever once they emerged from the pack". Despite liking the new tutorial and the "intense, breathless campaign, The Guardian criticized the harsher auto-resolve as making the title more repetitive, "a harsher autoresolve and tighter map means a tiresome number of forced manual battles". Rock Paper Shotgun enjoyed the demonic realms the player had to fight through "The realms only become accessible during magical mega-storms, occurring intermittently through the campaign, during which loads of portals appear on the map, corrupting the landscape and blopping out armies of devils... they give the same sense of apocalyptic desperation as the buildup to the endgame in Frostpunk".

References

External links
 

2022 video games
Creative Assembly games
Crossover video games
Linux games
MacOS games
Multiplayer and single-player video games
Real-time tactics video games
Sega video games
Total War (video game series)
Turn-based strategy video games
Video games developed in the United Kingdom
Warhammer Fantasy video games
Windows games
Grand strategy video games
Video game sequels